Vemana Institute of Technology is an Engineering college in Koramangala, Bangalore. It was established in the year 1999. It is affiliated to V.T.U. It offers undergraduate courses in computer science, information science, electronics and communications, mechanical engineering, and civil engineering. It also offers courses in postgraduate studies and allied engineering. The library on campus holds relevant books,E-annual reports, and newspapers.

References 

1999 establishments in Karnataka
Engineering colleges in Bangalore
Educational institutions established in 1999